The 2011 season of the FFAS Senior League was the thirty-first season of association football competition in American Samoa. Pago Youth A won the championship, their third recorded title and second in a row, with the winners of the 2006 league competition and a number of previous seasons unknown.

All games were played at the Kananafou Theological Seminary College Sports Field due to the FFAS soccer field in Pago Pago undergoing improvements due to the damage after the 2009 Samoa earthquake and tsunami.

Format
Eighteen teams competed in the league divided into two groups of nine. The top two teams in each group qualified automatically for the semi final stage. The group stage was played on a round robin basis and all knockout rounds were one-legged.

Pool A

Table

Pool B

Table

Knockout stage

Semi finals

Third place match

Final

References

FFAS Senior League seasons
Amer
football